Ponerorchis trifurcata is a species of flowering plant in the family Orchidaceae, native to south-central China (north-west Yunnan).

Taxonomy
The species was first described in 1982 as Amitostigma trifurcatum. A molecular phylogenetic study in 2014 found that species of Amitostigma, Neottianthe and Ponerorchis were mixed together in a single clade, making none of the three genera monophyletic as then circumscribed. Amitostigma and Neottianthe were subsumed into Ponerorchis, with this species becoming Ponerorchis trifurcata.

References

trifurcata
Orchids of Yunnan
Plants described in 1982